Ana Aslan (born 1 January 1897, Braila, Kingdom of Romania – died 20 May 1988, Bucharest, Socialist Republic of Romania) was a Romanian biologist and physician, specialist in gerontology, academician from 1974 and the director of the National Institute of Geriatrics and Gerontology (1958 - 1988).

Early life 
Ana was the youngest of four children, two brothers and two sisters, born to Margarit and Sofia Aslan. Ana was said to be a very intellectual child, learning to read and write already by age four. At the age of 13, her father died, and her family then moved to Bucharest, Romania. It was in Bucharest where she began her studies. She graduated from the Central School of Bucharest in 1915. The premature death of her father, whom she was close to, was said to be the reason she wanted to become a physician. Although the medical field was not a desirable field for women to enter, Ana Aslan decided that was the path she wanted to pursue and attended the Faculty of Medicine from 1915 to 1922. Her mother did not support this decision of becoming a physician because of financial strains, so Ana Aslan went on a hunger strike until her mother accepted her medical career. During her time in undergraduate studies, she attended to soldiers as a nurse during the First World War.

Research 

After graduating from the Faculty of Medicine in 1922, she began working with Daniel Danielopolu who supervised her doctoral thesis. She obtained her M.D. degree in cardiovascular physiology in 1924. Her focus was on physiology and the process of ageing. While experimenting on the effects that procaine had on arthritis, Aslan discovered other beneficial effects of this drug. It was this discovery that led to a three-year study and eventual invention of her drug called Gerovital (H3), which she prescribed for the effects of aging. With hesitation from fellow scientists that Gerovital was a "fountain of youth", Aslan kicked off a research study to prove the results. Over a period of two years, blood samples were taken from 15,000 people, with some of them receiving Gerovital and some receiving a placebo. 40% of the people who took Gerovital had less sick-leave days, and mortality rate from the flu epidemic was 13% in placebo patients while only being 2.7% in patients who took the drug. In 1976, with a pharmacist named Elena Polovrăgeanu, they invented another drug named Aslavital, which was a similar drug to Gerovital aimed to delay the skin aging process.

Awards 

Ana Aslan received many international distinctions for her research activity, for example:
  Member of the International Academy of Science, Munich and first Co-President
 "Cross of Merit" – First Class of the Order of Merit, Germany, 1971
 "Cavalier de la Nouvelle Europe" Prize Oscar, Italy, 1973
 "Les Palmes Academiques", France, 1974
 "Honorary Foreign Citizen and Honorary Professor of Sciences", Philippines, 1978
 "Member Honoris Causa" Diploma of the Bohemo-Slovakian Society of Gerontology, 1981
 "Leon Bernard" Prize, important distinction granted by the World Health Organization upon nomination and endorsement by officials of a member state (in this case by the Romanian Nicolae Ceauşescu) for contributing to the development of gerontology and geriatrics, 1982

Cosmetic lines 

Ana Aslan patented two cosmetic products (hair lotion and cream Gerovital H3), entrusting their production to Farmec company and Miraj. The two companies have since diversified their range of cosmetics, and traditional procaine hydrochloride was eliminated from the formula.

Legacy 
Ana Aslan was considered a pioneer of social medicine. Years after becoming the head of the physiology department at the Institute of Endocrinology of Bucharest, she founded the Institute of Geriatrics of Bucharest. Ana Aslan, in 1959 organized the Romanian Society of Gerontology and Geriatrics. The Romanian Society of Gerontology was the first in the world to channel its research into clinic, experimental, and social researches, devise a therapeutic strategy to prevent the process of aging, and organize and national health network for the prevention of aging. Her drug was used by many famous politicians and celebrities around the world, including John F. Kennedy.

References

External links

"Ana Aslan" Institute of Gerontology and Geriatrics Official Website
Ana Aslan, Encyclopedia of Romania (in Romanian)

1897 births
1988 deaths
Female nurses in World War I
People from Brăila
Titular members of the Romanian Academy
Romanian biologists
Romanian gerontologists
20th-century Romanian inventors
Biogerontologists
Women biologists
Officers Crosses of the Order of Merit of the Federal Republic of Germany
Romanian women physicians
Romanian women scientists
20th-century women scientists
Women medical researchers
Women inventors
Carol Davila University of Medicine and Pharmacy alumni
Armenian women physicians
20th-century biologists
Léon Bernard Foundation Prize laureates